LendUp was an American online direct lender.  It offered payday loans, installment loans, and credit cards to consumers with low credit scores using publicly available data to assess creditworthiness.  The company referred to its customers as “the emerging middle class.” LendUp also issued credit cards in partnership with Tom Steyer's Beneficial State Bank.

LendUp was co-founded by in 2011 by stepbrothers Sasha Orloff and Jake Rosenberg and incubated at Y Combinator.The company positioned itself as a "socially responsible lender," and claimed to provide access to financial services for "underbanked" Americans in addition to lower cost credit and credit-building opportunities.

LendUp received $325 million in equity and debt financing from PayPal, Kleiner Perkins Caufield & Byers, Google Ventures, Andreessen Horowitz, Alexis Ohanian, Y Combinator and QED Investors, among others. In an article published shortly after the company's launch, Time Magazine wrote that LendUp "says it’s not like other payday lenders. Yet the fees it charges — a little over $30 to borrow $200 for two weeks — are similar to what its competitors charge."

In 2016, LendUp paid $6.3 million in fines for deceptive practices  and widespread violations of payday and installment loan laws.  In 2016 it was again sued by the Consumer Financial Protection Bureau for violating the Military Lending Act.

In December 2021, as a result of deceptive marketing and fair lending violations, LendUp was fined $100,000 by The U.S. Consumer Financial Protection Bureau.  Additionally, the company was required to stop issuing new loans and stop attempts to collect on certain loans.  The action was taken to resolve a September 2021 lawsuit that alleged LendUp practiced illegal and deceptive marketing in violation of the 2016 finding. It ceased loan operations in January 2022.

Ahead Financials
In December 2020, LendUp launched Ahead Financials, a digital platform led by LendUp executives.  Ahead targets financially underserved consumers.

References

External links 
 Official Website

Companies based in San Francisco
Privately held companies of the United States
Financial services companies of the United States
Social finance
Y Combinator companies
2012 establishments in California
Financial services companies established in 2012
American companies established in 2012